Mkhitaryan, Mkhitarian or Mekhitarian (Western Armenian Մխիթարեան) is an Armenian surname. See Մխիթարյան for the origin.

Notable People
Notable people with the surname include:

Artists 
 Anahit Mekhitarian (born 1969), Armenian operatic soprano
 Gor Mkhitarian (born 1973), Armenian singer and songwriter

Politicians 
 Arzik Mkhitaryan (born 1946), member of the National Assembly of Artsakh

Sportspeople 
 Ashot Mkhitaryan (1959–2010), Armenian head of the National weightlifting team of Armenia
 Hamlet Mkhitaryan (footballer, born 1962) or Hamlet Apetnakovich Mkhitaryan (1962–1996), Soviet/Armenian footballer who played as a striker
 Henrikh Mkhitaryan (born 1989), Armenian footballer who plays as a midfielder, son of Hamlet Mkhitaryan
 Hamlet Mkhitaryan (footballer, born 1973), or Hamlet Vladimirovich Mkhitaryan, Armenian footballer who plays as a midfielder
 Krikor Mekhitarian (born 1986), Brazilian chess master of Armenian descent
 Oganez Mkhitaryan (born 1962), Armenian football coach and former player

See also
Mechitarists, also spelled Mekhitarists, or Mekhitarian Fathers, headquartered in Venice and Vienna, congregation of Benedictine monks of the Armenian Catholic Church founded in 1717 by Abbot Mekhitar of Sebaste.

Armenian-language surnames